Bittium impendens is a species of sea snail, a marine gastropod mollusk in the family Cerithiidae.

Description

Distribution

References

Cerithiidae
Gastropods described in 1899